Paul Kirk may refer to:
Paul G. Kirk (born 1938), former United States Senator from Massachusetts and former chairman of the Democratic National Committee
Paul G. Kirk Sr. (1904–1981), associate justice of the Massachusetts Supreme Judicial Court.
Paul H. Kirk (1914–1995), American architect
Paul L. Kirk (1902–1970), American chemist, forensic scientist, and Manhattan Project participant
Manhunter (comics)#Paul Kirk, a DC Comics comic book character
Paul Kirk (footballer) (born 1953), retired Irish league footballer and manager
Paul Thomsen Kirk, electronic musician